Blood on the Wall is a lo-fi, Brooklyn-based indie rock band, influenced by bands like The Jesus and Mary Chain, Pavement, Pixies, and Sonic Youth. Band members include siblings Courtney (bassist/vocalist) and Brad Shanks (guitarist/vocalist) and drummer Miggy Littleton. They have released three full-length albums, Blood on the Wall (2003), Awesomer (2005), and Liferz (2008). Blood on the Wall are signed to the Brooklyn-based label The Social Registry.

Discography
 Blood on the Wall (2003)
 Awesomer (Social Registry, FatCat) (2005)
 Liferz (2008)

External links
 PUNKCAST#317 Live video – Rare NYC – August 28, 2003. (RealPlayer)
 PUNKCAST#837 Live video – Tonic NYC – September 15, 2005. (RealPlayer, mp4)
 77 Boadrum Site Profile Viva Radio, Sep 2007.  (Flash)
 Impose Magazine article and mp3 download

Indie rock musical groups from New York (state)
Musical groups from Brooklyn